For the French milliner, see Claude Saint-Cyr, For the Marshal of France see Laurent de Gouvion Saint-Cyr

Claude Carra Saint-Cyr (born 28 July 1760 in Lyon, died 5 January 1834 in Vailly-sur-Aisne) was a French general and diplomat, noted for his participation to the French Revolutionary and Napoleonic Wars.

Carra Saint-Cyr entered active service in 1774, with the Bourdonnais regiment, and was a part of the French expeditionary corps during the American War of Independence. He was a captain and held a position in the military commissariat. With the outbreak of the Wars of the Revolution, Carra Saint-Cyr resumed active duty, serving in the army of the West as aide-de-camp to general Jean-Baptiste Annibal Aubert du Bayet, subsequently accompanying Aubert du Bayet to Constantinople, where the latter was appointed ambassador to the Ottoman Empire. Carra Saint-Cyr then served as consul in Wallachia, before returning to France, in 1798. He was at Marengo in 1800 and became a general of division in 1803. Named governor of Magdeburg in 1806, he was created baron of the Empire two years later and in 1809 he held the command of an infantry division during the War of the Fifth Coalition, playing an important role at the battle of Aspern-Essling. He was named governor of Dresden and in 1813 governor of Hamburg and in this capacity evacuated the city with his troops and was defeated on the Elbe. For this, he was disgraced, but general Dominique Vandamme still gave him the command of a division, with the mission of defending the Ems river. With the Bourbon Restoration of 1814, Carra Saint-Cyr was created count and named governor of the French Guiana, a position that he would hold from 1814 to 1819. His name appears on the Arc de Triomphe in Paris.

References

Sources
Fierro, Alfredo; Palluel-Guillard, André; Tulard, Jean - "Histoire et Dictionnaire du Consulat et de l'Empire”, Éditions Robert Laffont, 

French military personnel of the French Revolutionary Wars
French commanders of the Napoleonic Wars
Barons of the First French Empire
1760 births
1834 deaths
Governors of French Guiana
Names inscribed under the Arc de Triomphe